General Shankar Roychowdhury  is a former Chief of Army Staff of the Indian Army, and a former member of the Indian Parliament.

Early life
General Roychowdhury was born in Kolkata, West Bengal, India into the Zamindar family of Taki (India), a Bengali Kayastha family, on 6 September 1937. He received his schooling at St. Xavier's Collegiate School in Kolkata and later at Wynberg Allen School, Mussoorie and St. George's College, Mussoorie. He then became a cadet in the Joint Services Wing of the Indian Armed Forces in 1953.

Military career
General Shankar Roychowdhury was commissioned into the 20 Lancers of the Indian Army Armoured Corps on 9 June 1957, after graduating from the Indian Military Academy. He took part in the Indo-Pakistani War of 1965 in the Chamb-Jaurian sector, and in Jessore and Khulna during the Bangladesh Liberation War in 1971. He commanded the 20 Lancers from 1974 to 1976, an Independent Armoured Brigade from December 1980 to July 1983, and an Armoured Division from May 1988 to May 1990. He subsequently commanded the 16 Corps in Jammu and Kashmir from 1991 to 1992.

He is a graduate of the Indian Military Academy Dehradun, National Defence Academy Pune, Defence Services Staff College, Army War College; National Defence College and also holds a Doctorate D.Litt. (Honoris CAVSA). He held several staff and instructional appointments, including that of Director General Combat Vehicles dealing with the Arjun tank.

He was awarded the Param Vishisht Seva Medal for distinguished service to the Indian Army and the nation. He took over as GOC-in-C, Army Training Command (ARTRAC) in August 1992. He assumed charge of the Indian Army as the 18th Chief of Army Staff on 22 November 1994, upon the untimely death of his predecessor, General B.C. Joshi. He retired from the Indian Army on 30 September 1997, after 40 years of military service.

Post-retirement
After retirement from the Army, General Roychowdhury became a member of the Rajya Sabha, where he highlighted defence related issues. Since 21 January 2008, he has been a Director of Indian Metal & Ferro Alloys Ltd. His autobiography titled Officially at Peace was published by Penguin Books in 2002.

Honours and decorations

Dates of rank

References

External links
Maoists are also our fellow Indians: General Shankar Roychowdhury, IBN Live, 29 May 2013.
Ex Indian Army chief talks about Indo-Bangla ties, Hindustan Times, 16 March 2013.
Former Army chief Shankar Roychowdhury backs General VK Singh in age row, The Economic Times, 22 January 2012.

Notable publications
Deccan Chronicle
The Asian Age

1937 births
Living people
Chiefs of Army Staff (India)
Military personnel from Kolkata
Recipients of the Param Vishisht Seva Medal
People from West Bengal
Bengali people
Indian generals
National Defence College, India alumni
Defence Services Staff College alumni
Army War College, Mhow alumni